Nörvenich Air Base (Fliegerhorst Nörvenich) is a German Air Force air base in Germany .

It is the home of Taktisches Luftwaffengeschwader 31 "Boelcke".  The squadron flies the Eurofighter Typhoon.

History
It was built for the RAF Germany in 1952 and opened in August 1954. In 1958, Jagdbombergeschwader 31 (Fighter-Bomber Wing 31; abbreviated as: JaBoG 31) based at Nörvenich, was the first German fighter-bomber wing to use the U.S.-built Republic F-84F Thunderstreak of the United States Air Force. In January 1959, this squadron was the first German Air Force wing to be assigned to NATO. In 1961 it was the first wing to use Lockheed F-104 Starfighters. The first "Tornado" (Panavia PA 200) started in July 1983 from the air base. Since June 2010 the squadron has been flying Eurofighter Typhoons.

During 17 to 28 August 2020, the Israeli Air Force made a historic fighter deployment when six F-16C/D Fighting Falcon “Barak” fighter jets operated from the base. This marked the first time in history Israeli combat aircraft had landed in Germany. The Israeli jets took part in Exercise Blue Wings 2020 with the resident Taktisches Luftwaffengeschwader 31 and their Eurofighters.

References

 FNörvenich Air Base
 Johnson, David C. (1988), U.S. Army Air Forces Continental Airfields (ETO), D-Day to V-E Day; Research Division, USAF Historical Research Center, Maxwell AFB, Alabama.

External links

Bases of the German Air Force
Airports in North Rhine-Westphalia